Cwmgiedd is a small village beside the River Giedd within the community of Ystradgynlais, Powys, Wales. It lies 22.5 km (15 miles) north-east of Swansea and 253 km (157 miles) west of London.

The Silent Village, a 1943 British propaganda film about the destruction by the Nazi occupiers of the Czech village Lidice, was filmed here.

See also
 John Thomas, Baron Thomas of Cwmgiedd
 Swansea Valley

References

Villages in Powys